The Svea Artillery Regiment, designation A 1, was a Swedish Army artillery regiment that traced its origins back to the 17th century. It was disbanded in 1997. The regiment's soldiers were originally recruited from Svealand, and it was also garrisoned there.

History 

The regiment has its origins in the Artillery Regiment raised in 1636. That regiment was split into four new regiments in 1794 of which Svea Artillery Regiment was one. The regiment was given the designation A 1 (1st Artillery Regiment) in 1830. In 1889 three companies garrisoned in Vaxholm became independent and formed Vaxholm Artillery Corps.

In 1893 another four companies were split off to form Norrland Artillery Regiment and 2nd Svea Artillery Regiment. Due to this the regiment also changed name to 1st Svea Artillery Regiment. The name was changed back again in 1904. The regiment was garrisoned in Stockholm but moved to Linköping in 1963 before being disbanded in 1997.

Campaigns 

?

Organisation 

?

Heraldry and traditions

Coat of arms
The coat of the arms of the Svea Artillery Regiment (A 1) 1977–1997. Blazon: "Azure, the lesser coat of arms of Sweden, three open crowns or. The shield surmounted two gunbarrels of older pattern in saltire or. The gunbarrels may be sable".

Medals
In 1943, the Svea artilleriregementes (A 1) förtjänstmedalj ("Svea Artillery Regiment (A 1) Medal of Merit") in gold and silver (SveaartregGM/SM) of the 8th size was established. The medal ribbon is divided in blue, red and blue moiré.

In 1997, the Svea artilleriregementes (A 1) minnesmedalj ("Svea Artillery Regiment (A 1) Commemorative Medal") in bronze (SveartregSMM) of the 8th size was established. The medal ribbon is of blue moiré with a broad red stripe on the middle followed on both sides by a yellow stripe.

Commanding officers
Regimental commanders between 1900 and 1997.

Commanders

1898–1902: Salomon Gottschalk Alfons Geijer
1902–1909: Otto Wilhelm Virgin
1909–1918: Gabriel Torén
1918–1922: Axel Breitholtz
1922–1926: Ludvig Hammarskiöld
1926–1927: Axel Lyström
1928–1935: Pehr Lagerhjelm
1935–1937: Sture Gadd
1937–1938: Hjalmar Thorén
1938–1940: Axel Rappe
1940–1941: Samuel Åkerhielm (acting 1939)
1941–1941: Gunnar Ekeroth (acting 1941)
1941–1942: Gustaf Dyrssen
1942–1948: Folke Ericsson
1948–1951: Bert Carpelan
1951–1953: Karl Ångström
1953–1955: Gunnar af Klintberg
1955–1959: Bengt Elis Leopold Brucsewitz
1959–1961: Stig Lindström
1961–1966: Carl Reuterswärd
1966–1968: Tore Gustaf Arne Rääf
1968–1974: Sven Werner
1974–1979: Åke Eriksson
1979–1982: Sven Perfors
1982–1987: Rune Eriksson
1987–1990: Karl-Ivar Pesula
1990–1995: Curt-Christer Gustafsson
1995–1997: Christer Lidström

Deputy commanders
1974–1976: Lieutenant colonel Fredrik Lilliecreutz

Names, designations and locations

See also
List of Swedish artillery regiments

Footnotes

References

Notes

Print

Further reading

Artillery regiments of the Swedish Army
Military units and formations established in 1794
Military units and formations disestablished in 1997
1794 establishments in Sweden
1997 disestablishments in Sweden
Disbanded units and formations of Sweden
Stockholm Garrison
Linköping Garrison